Grovane is a village in Vennesla municipality in Agder county, Norway.

Railway
The Sørlandsbanen railway line runs through the village stopping at Grovane Station. The station was historically a stop along the Setesdal Line. While the original Setesdal Line was a narrow-gauge railway, Sørlandsbanen was (and still is) a standard gauge railway. After the Sørlandsbanen was completed to Kristiansand in 1938, Grovane station became the terminus station for the Setesdal Line. Freight and passengers had to change trains for onward transport by Sørlandsbanen.

Today, the Setesdal Line (first opened 1885, closed 1962) is a heritage railway and a railway museum with steam trains serving the  line between Grovane and Røyknes. Four steam locomotives from 1894-1902 are preserved, along with a number of passenger and freight cars.

References

Villages in Agder
Vennesla